Thomas Copley, alias Philip Fisher (1596 – 1652) was an English Jesuit missionary in North America.

Copley Hall, a residence hall at Georgetown University, is named after Thomas Copley.

Life
He was the eldest son of William Copley of Gatton, England, and grandson of Sir Thomas Copley, of a recusant family. He arrived in Maryland in 1637, and, being a man of great executive ability, took over the care of the mission, "a charge which at that time required rather business men than missionaries".

In 1645, Fisher was arrested and carried in chains to England, with Father Andrew White, the founder of the English mission in America. After enduring hardships he was released, and returned to Maryland (February, 1648). He made an effort to enter Virginia; this appears from a letter written 1 March 1648, to the Jesuit General Vincenzo Carafa in Rome, in which he says:  There is no further record bearing on the projected visit. Neill, in his "Terra Mariae" (p. 70), and Smith in his "Religion under the Barons of Baltimore" (p. VII), confuse this Father Thomas Copley of Maryland with an apostate Catholic, John Copley, who was never a Jesuit. Father Fisher is mentioned in the missionary annals of Maryland, and, according to Hughes, was "the most distinguished man among the fourteen Jesuits who had worked in Maryland".

References

Attribution
 
 The entry cites:
Hughes, "History of the Society of Jesus in North America" (London and New York, 1907), Text, I passim; Documents I, part I;
John Gilmary Shea, "The Catholic Church in Colonial Days" (New York, 1886), 38, 46-47, 53;
Foley, "Records of English Province S.J. (London, 1882), VII, 255;
Dorsey, "Life of Father Thomas Copley", published in "Woodstock Letters", XIV, 223; "Woodstock Letters", XI, 18-24; XII, 104-105; XV, 44, 47;
George Oliver, "Collections ... Scotch, English and Irish Members of S.J." (London, 1845), 91, 92;
Russell, "Maryland, the Land of the Sanctuary" (Baltimore, 1907), 88, 125, 127, 156-159, 171-173;

1596 births
1652 deaths
17th-century English Jesuits
Roman Catholic missionaries in the United States
People of colonial Maryland
English Roman Catholics